Martin Crosbie (7 April 1911 – 10 February 1982) was an Irish tenor and older brother to Paddy Crosbie of The School Around the Corner. Martin, who was affectionately known as "The Miller's daughter", a song he made his own, started in show business in his early 1930s.

Life
The eldest in a family of four, he was christened John Martin but was known as Mossy to his family and friends. His mother and father came from Wexford town. His father, Martin, was a foreman-fitter and turner on the Permanent way, that is the tracks section, of the old Dublin United Tramways. Before coming to Dublin, his father had earned quite a reputation in his native town, both as a singer and comedian. He won the Wexford Feis gold medal in 1904 in the tenor competition. Martin's paternal grandmother was reputed to have had a three-octave voice, and sang in Bride Street Church (Church of the Assumption), Wexford. Before his singing career began, he worked as a fitter/mechanic in CIE's Summerhill depot.

"One night in the late 1930s himself and the legendary Billy Morton went to a show in the Olympia. In the bar during the interval Billy and other friends talked him into singing a song. One song led to another and soon there were more people in the bar than in the audience. The manager came in and said if he could keep an audience away from the show he should be able to keep them in their seats the following week. That's how he joined Lorcan Bourke Productions. Martin caused a bit of stir the next Monday night when he cycled to the Olympia, walked through the stage door, hung up his bicycle clips, and went straight out on stage to sing. I didn't know anything then about using dressing-rooms and make-up he had laughed."

His CIE supervisor recognised a genuine talent and gave him a couple of months leave of absence, and pretty soon Martin was a star of variety at the Royal and the Capitol where the "Miller's Daughter" legend was born in 1942.

It was when he was playing in Belfast with Harry Bailey that he met Thelma Ramsey, who would become his wife. When he came back to the Royal in Dublin, Thelma was the accompanist. They toured with some of showbiz's big names, including famous comic Max Miller. They missed out on playing the London Palladium with Max as he was allowed to bring only one other act. A halfpenny was tossed and they lost. "Imagine losing the Palladium with a halfpenny… wouldn't have minded had it been half-a-crown!"

A regular in the Clontarf Castle Cabaret from 1964, he continued to perform six nights a week even when his health started to fail him in the early 1980s. In 1979, he received the Variety Artists' Trust Society award for his contribution to Irish show business. He made numerous Television appearances, some of which still survive on R.T.E. and Ulster Television etc. He was a member of Equity and appeared in small parts in most of the Films made in Ireland at that time.

Films
 Sinful Davey – 1969 – Sinful Davey (Movie Clip) The Condemned Man
 Davey (John Hurt) and McNab (Ronald Fraser) are attempting to swipe the corpse of hanged Tom Pepper when they encounter the authorities,(i.e. Martin as one of the Constables ) in John Huston's comedy of 19th century Scotland, Sinful Davey, 1969.
 Of human bondage – (1964) Lab Technician
 A Bus Ride To Success – He played a bus conductor 
 Young Cassidy – (1965) –  2nd Hearseman Young Cassidy clips
 Underground – (1970) R.A.F. Sergeant Underground (1970)
 Quackser Fortune has a Cousin in the Bronx (1973) – Policeman
 Lockup Your Daughters (1969) Lock-Up-Your-Daughters
 The Spy Who Came in From The Cold (1965)  { As a stand in for Richard Burton }

Death

Martin Crosbie died on 10 February 1982 from cancer. He is buried in Glasnevin Cemetery Dublin. A special Tribute Show was held in The Olympia on Sunday 28 February by his friends in show business –  Listed as they appeared on the bill.

Al Banim
Billie Barry Dancers
David Beggs
Chris Casey
Paddy Crosbie
Val Fitzpatrick
Val Joyce
Tony Kenny
Jack Leonard
Sean Mooney
Vera Morgan
Kathy Nugent
Pat & Jean
Maureen Potter
Shamrog
Des Smyth

References

External links
 Martin Crosbie from RTE Stills Library

1911 births
1982 deaths
Irish tenors
20th-century Irish male singers
Music hall performers
Irish male stage actors
Singers from Dublin (city)
Burials at Glasnevin Cemetery
20th-century male actors from Northern Ireland